Le Fleix is a commune in the Dordogne department in Nouvelle-Aquitaine in southwestern France.

Le Fleix lies on the banks of the Dordogne at a place where the river bends. This is likely the origin of the name "flexus".

History
Le Fleix is famous for the Treaty of Fleix, signed there in 1580.

There were once two castles in Le Fleix, the Old Castle, which was destroyed, and the New Castle built in the 17th century as a residence for Frédéric de Foix. It was sold during the French Revolution, and became a Protestant church in 1805.

Population

Economy
The harbour is active in the timber and wine trades. The economy, once based on the river, is now primarily viticultural.

Notable people
Andre Morize (1883-1957), French professor

See also
Communes of the Dordogne department

References

Communes of Dordogne